Abu Alimeh or Abu Aleymeh or Abu Oleymeh may refer to:
 Abu Alimeh, Haftgel
 Abu Oleymeh, Ramshir